Kiora is a locality in the Eurobodalla Shire, New South Wales, Australia. It is located about 11 km west of Moruya on the road to Araluen at the point where the Deua River becomes estuarine and changes its name to the Moruya River. Its name derives from the Kiora House, which belonged to John Hawdon. It had a public school from 1868 to 1928.

References

Localities in New South Wales
Eurobodalla Shire
Towns in the South Coast (New South Wales)